HMS Magpie was launched at Jamaica in 1826 as the name vessel of her class. She was lost two months after her launch.

Origins
There was a third vessel, Nimble, that the Navy found defective and refused to accept.

Career
Lieutenant Edward Smith commissioned Magpie in 1826. On 16 August Magpie was in company with  when they chased the slave ship Minerva into Havana. She landed her slaves during the night. The Captain-General refused to take action and Minerva was not seized.

Loss
Magpie was cruising off the Arrecifes do los Colorados of Cuba on 27 August 1826 when a sudden squall in the evening caused her to capsize. A few survivors were able to right an over-turned boat. While some men climbed in to bail her out, the others held on to the sides. Next morning sharks killed two men and bit off Lieutenant Smith's legs, which led quickly to his death. The remaining six survivors drifted for three days without water or food. Four went mad and jumped overboard; a passing brig rescued the last two men.

Notes, citations, and references
Notes

Citations

References
 
 
 

1826 ships
Schooners of the Royal Navy
Ships involved in anti-piracy efforts
Maritime incidents in August 1826